Erik Björndahl (born 13 July 1990) is a Swedish football striker who plays for Örebro SK. While at Degerfors IF, he was the 2019 Superettan top scorer.

References

1990 births
Living people
Swedish footballers
Association football forwards
BK Forward players
Degerfors IF players
Örebro SK players
Västerås SK Fotboll players
Ettan Fotboll players
Superettan players
Allsvenskan players